Berkeley nuclear power station is a decommissioned Magnox nuclear power station situated on the bank of the River Severn in Gloucestershire, England. The ongoing decommissioning process is being managed by Nuclear Decommissioning Authority subsidiary Magnox Ltd.

History
The construction of the power station, which was undertaken by a consortium of AEI and John Thompson, began in 1956. It had two Magnox reactors producing 276megawatts (MW) in total – enough electricity on a typical day to serve an urban area the size of Bristol. The reactors were supplied by The Nuclear Power Group (TNPG) and the turbines by AEI. Electricity generation started in 1962 and ran for 27 years to 1989.

Nuclear fuel for Berkeley power station was delivered and removed via the nearest railhead, a loading facility on the Sharpness single railway line. This included a dedicated siding and a gantry crane.

Specification 
Berkeley had four 83MW turbo-alternator generators, giving a gross capability of 334.4MW and a net capability of 276MW. The steam conditions at the turbine stop valve were 20.3 / 3.9bar and 319 / 316°C. In the year 1978/9 the station generated 1,392.63GWh, and in 1980/1 the station generated 1,003.923GWh, The overall thermal efficiency of the station in 1981 was 21.12 per cent.

Closure 
Reactor 2 was shut down in October 1988, followed by Reactor 1 in March 1989. Berkeley was the first commercial nuclear power station in the United Kingdom to be decommissioned.
So far the nuclear decommissioning process has involved the removal of all fuel from the site in 1992, and the demolition of structures such as the turbine hall in 1995 and cooling ponds in 2001. The next step of decommissioning will be the care and maintenance stage of the nuclear reactor structures, scheduled to commence in 2026, until radioactive decay means that they can be demolished and the site completely cleared between 2070 and 2080.

In March 2012, five of the 310-tonne boilers were moved from the station to Sweden for decontamination and recycling.

In December 2013, the Nuclear Decommissioning Authority selected Berkeley as the preferred interim store for Intermediate-level waste from the decommissioned Oldbury nuclear power station. This became operational in 2014.

The surrounding area is designated a Site of Special Scientific Interest (SSSI) and Special Protection Area (SPA) and a RAMSAR wetland of international importance.

Berkeley Nuclear Laboratories
Just south of the power station were Berkeley Nuclear Laboratories, one of the UK’s three main nuclear power industry research centres. At its peak about 750 staff worked at the labs including 200 scientists and engineers.

By 2023, the site and some surrounding land was converted into a  technology park now called Gloucestershire Science & Technology Park, by a subsidiary of South Gloucestershire and Stroud College. At the centre of the site the former engineering rig hall, building D24, the John Huggett Engineering Hall, was converted into a college engineering campus. Alongside which was built a university technical college. The site now accommodates Bloodhound LSR and Gloucestershire Constabulary.

See also

Energy policy of the United Kingdom
Nuclear power in the United Kingdom
Energy use and conservation in the United Kingdom

References

External links

Nuclear Decommissioning Authority – Berkeley
Berkeley Site Stakeholder Group

Energy infrastructure completed in 1962
Buildings and structures in Gloucestershire
Power stations in South West England
Former nuclear power stations in England
1962 establishments in England
1989 disestablishments in England
Berkeley, Gloucestershire